"Ghetto Flower" is the third single from J. Williams' debut studio album, Young Love written by his sister, Lavina Williams, known as a member of New Zealand 90s girl band, MaVelle. The single was released on 16 March 2009.

Chart performance
The single entered the New Zealand Singles Chart of 30 March 2009 at 28th position, and peaked at 6th position for 3 non-consecutive weeks in April and May 2009.

Year-end charts

References

J. Williams (singer) songs
2009 singles
2009 songs
Illegal Musik singles
Songs written by J. Williams (singer)
Songs written by Inoke Finau